The League of Ireland Premier Division Manager of the Year Award is an award handed out annually to a League of Ireland Premier Division  manager, voted best in the league for that particular year. The last winner of the award was Pat Fenlon, who guided Bohemians to a league and cup double in 2008.

Past winners

League of Ireland Premier Division
League of Ireland trophies and awards
Republic of Ireland association football trophies and awards
Ireland